Sports in Chicago include many professional sports teams. Chicago is one of ten U.S. cities to have teams from the five major American professional team sports (baseball, football, basketball, hockey, and soccer). Chicago has been named as the "Best Sports City" by Sporting News three times: 1993, 2006, and 2010.

Chicago was a candidate city for the 2016 Summer Olympics but lost to Rio de Janeiro. Chicago also hosted the 1959 Pan American Games, as well as the 2006 Gay Games. Chicago hosted the inaugural 1968 Special Olympics Summer World Games as well as its second games in 1970. Chicago also was the host of the 2017 Warrior Games.

Major league teams

The following is a list of active, professional major-league Chicago sports teams, ranked by attendance:

Soccer (MLS, NWSL)

Soccer in Chicago can be traced back to Chicago Sparta. Founded in 1917 by immigrant Czechs, Sparta competed in several leagues during its existence. The club's achievements include: winning the National Soccer League of Chicago; winning 9 titles in Chicago's International League, of which the team was a member 1926–1936; and winning the National Challenge Cup twice.
In the 1950s, the Chicago Falcons operated. They won the National Challenge Cup in 1953.

Chicago was once the home of the Chicago Sting who competed in the major professional North American Soccer League (NASL) from 1975 to 1984. They spread their home games at Soldier Field, Wrigley Field, and Comiskey Park. The Sting won the Soccer Bowl twice: 1981 and 1984. They were the only club other than the New York Cosmos to win multiple titles in the NASL  One of the club's notable players was German forward Arno Steffenhagen.

Chicago Fire FC, a member of Major League Soccer (MLS), have won one MLS Cup and four U.S. Open Cups since they entered the league in 1998. The Fire won their sole MLS Cup in 1998, their inaugural season, led by head coach Bob Bradley, who later went on to coach the U.S. national soccer team. The Fire played from 2006 to 2019 at SeatGeek Stadium (originally Toyota Park), a soccer-specific stadium located in the Chicago suburb of Bridgeview near Midway Airport. The club currently plays at Soldier Field after finalizing an agreement with the Chicago Park District in September 2019. Some notable former players include Cuauhtémoc Blanco from Mexico, Brian McBride from the U.S., Peter Nowak from Poland, and Bastian Schweinsteiger from Germany – a demonstration of the team's international flavor. The club is named after the Great Chicago Fire of 1871.

Chicago is also home to the Chicago Red Stars, currently playing in the National Women's Soccer League. The Red Stars began their second stint at the venue now known as SeatGeek Stadium in 2016, having played there previously as a member of the now-defunct Women's Professional Soccer.

Baseball (MLB)
Chicago is one of four metro areas in the United States that has two Major League Baseball teams, the others being Los Angeles, New York City, and the San Francisco Bay Area. Of these, only Chicago and New York City have both teams in the city limits. Chicago is the only city that has had more than one MLB team every year since the founding of the American League in 1901 (New York City hosted one team between 1958 and 1962, and Los Angeles has only done so since 1961). The Chicago Cubs are members of the National League, while the Chicago White Sox are members of the American League.

The Cubs play in Wrigley Field in the North side neighborhood of Lakeview, in the Wrigleyville district. The Cubs are the oldest Major League Baseball team to have never changed their city, one of nine out of the sixteen teams to predate expansion that have not changed cities. They have played in Chicago since 1871, and continuously so since 1874 due to the Great Chicago Fire. The White Sox play in Guaranteed Rate Field in the South Side neighborhood of Armour Square. They have played in Chicago since the formation of the American League in 1901.

The Cubs' rivalry with the St. Louis Cardinals is one of the most bitter in North American professional sports. The Cubs are the oldest team to play continuously in the same city since the formation of the National League in 1876. They have played more games, have more wins and scored more runs than any other team in Major League baseball since 1876. They have won three World Series titles and are fourth among National League teams with 17 pennants. In 2016, the Cubs broke the two longest droughts in professional sports: They won their sport's title for the first time since 1908, a drought of 108 years, and participated in a World Series for the first time since 1945, a drought of 71 years.

The White Sox have played on the South Side continuously since 1901, with all three of their home fields throughout the years being within mere blocks of one another. They have won three World Series titles (1906, 1917, 2005) and six American League pennants, including the first in 1901. The Sox are fifth in the American League in all-time wins, and sixth in pennants.

Basketball (NBA, WNBA)
The Chicago Bulls of the National Basketball Association is a professional basketball team. Michael Jordan and Scottie Pippen led the Bulls to six NBA championships in two "threepeats" from 1991 to 1993 and again from 1996 to 1998.  The new generation of Bulls, known as "The Baby Bulls", emerged in 2005.  In 2007, they swept the defending champs, the Miami Heat. In 2011, led by league MVP Derrick Rose, the Bulls made it to the Eastern Finals, losing to the Miami Heat.

Chicago is home to the Chicago Sky of the Women's National Basketball Association. The Chicago Sky won the 2021 WNBA Finals beating the Phoenix Mercury 3-1.

American football (NFL)

The Chicago Bears of the National Football League play at Soldier Field. The Bears' history includes many NFL personalities, including owner George Halas, players Dick Butkus, Gale Sayers, Walter Payton, and coach Mike Ditka. The Bears are one of the original teams of the NFL, founded by Halas in 1919 in Decatur, Illinois. They currently have the most players inducted into the Pro Football Hall of Fame with 26. In 1985, the Bears won Super Bowl XX 46–10 over the New England Patriots. In the 2006 season, the Bears once again made it to the Super Bowl, but lost 29–17 to the Indianapolis Colts. They were led by coach Lovie Smith.

The Bears' rivalry with the Green Bay Packers dates back the 1920s, and is one of the most intense in American professional sports.  The Bears have other regional and divisional rivalries with the Minnesota Vikings and the Detroit Lions.

The Bears play their home games at Soldier Field, named after "The men and women of the armed forces". It is located next to the shores of Lake Michigan, on Lake Shore Drive. Soldier Field was an aging stadium and was in dire need of renovation by the end of the 20th century. In 2003, the stadium re-opened after an extensive renovation, which increased the number of luxury boxes and dramatically improved the game day experience for Bears fans. However, because of this renovation, the stadium lost its National Historic Landmark designation on February 17, 2006.

Ice hockey (NHL)
The Chicago Blackhawks of the National Hockey League is the city's professional ice hockey team, and are an Original Six team. The Blackhawks won the Stanley Cup in 1934, 1938, 1961, 2010, 2013, and again in 2015. The Blackhawks receive national attention for the intense rivalries with the Detroit Red Wings, also an Original Six team. Other rivalries include the Vancouver Canucks, St. Louis Blues (former Norris Division rivals), and the Nashville Predators.
Some well-known players include: Stan Mikita, Tony Esposito, Bobby Hull, Keith Magnuson, Glenn Hall, Denis Savard, Steve Larmer, Jeremy Roenick, Chris Chelios, Ed Belfour, Patrick Kane, Patrick Sharp, Marián Hossa, Corey Crawford and the current captain, Jonathan Toews.

Major league professional championships

Chicago Bears (NFL)
1 Super Bowl title
 1985 (XX)

8 NFL championships (pre–Super Bowl)
 1921
 1932
 1933
 1940
 1941
 1943
 1946
 1963

Chicago Cardinals (NFL)
2 NFL championships (pre–Super Bowl)
 1925
 1947

Chicago Cubs (MLB)
3 World Series titles
 1907
 1908
 2016

Chicago White Sox (MLB)
3 World Series titles
 1906
 1917
 2005

Chicago American Giants (NNL)
2 Negro World Series titles
 1926
 1927

Chicago Sting (NASL)
2 Soccer Bowl titles
 1981
 1984

Chicago Fire F.C. (MLS)
1 MLS Cup title
 1998

Chicago Bulls (NBA)
6 NBA Finals titles
 1991
 1992
 1993
 1996
 1997
 1998

Chicago Blackhawks (NHL)
6 Stanley Cup titles
 1934
 1938
 1961
 2010
 2013
 2015

Chicago Sky (WNBA)
1 WNBA Championship
 2021

Minor league teams
The following is a list of active minor league, semi-pro, and amateur Chicago sports teams, ranked by year of establishment:

Independent league baseball

Hockey
The Chicago metropolitan area is also home to the Chicago Wolves of the American Hockey League.  The Chicago Wolves have been successful, making numerous playoff appearances and winning the Turner and Calder cups many times. Playing in suburban Geneva are the Chicago Steel of the United States Hockey League, a Tier One Junior Hockey league, the only tier one junior league in the United States.

Arena football
The Chicago metropolitan area was also home to the Chicago Rush of the Arena Football League, who played at Allstate Arena in Rosemont. The Rush won its first championship in 2006, ArenaBowl XX. Chicago was also home to the Chicago Bruisers from 1987 to 1989, an original team in the AFL's inaugural season in 1987. The Bruisers hosted ArenaBowl II.

The Chicago Rush had been a member of the Arena Football League since 2001, and won ArenaBowl XX, playing in suburban Rosemont, although they now played in Rockford, as of 2013. The team has been defunct since 2013.

The Arena Football League front office was based in Chicago.

Rugby
The Chicago Griffins and Chicago Lions both play in the Rugby Super League

Chicago Stockyarders rugby league team played in 2010's AMNRL's War at the Shore in a 7s match against the Northern Raiders.

The most historically significant event in Chicago's rugby history, however, did not involve a local team. In international rugby union, Soldier Field was the site of the first-ever victory by Ireland over New Zealand, with the Irish defeating the All Blacks 40–29 on November 5, 2016.

Other sports
Chicago is home to the Chicago Force of the Independent Women's Football League, as well as the Chicago Bliss of the Legends Football League.

The Chicago area has also played host to the WWE's WrestleMania multiple times, most recently for WrestleMania 22. Five-time world champion CM Punk is a Chicago native who still lives in the city.
Chicago has also hosted major professional wrestling matches, including WrestleMania 22, and several other pay-per-view events, such as Money in the Bank in 2011, Extreme Rules in 2012, and WWE Payback in 2013. The northwest suburb of Hoffman Estates hosted All In in 2018, the first U.S. wrestling event not sponsored by WWE or the now-defunct WCW in 25 years to have sold more than 10,000 tickets. This event was the springboard for the creation of All Elite Wrestling (AEW) several months later. AEW would run two historically significant shows in the Chicago area in 2021. The first, The First Dance, was held at the United Center on August 20. During this show, CM Punk debuted for AEW, marking his first appearance as an active wrestler since his acrimonious departure from WWE in 2014. Then, during Labor Day weekend on September 5, the All Out pay-per-view saw AEW visit the same Hoffman Estates venue that had hosted All In. During this event, Punk wrestled his first match since his WWE departure, defeating Darby Allin. At the time, All Out was the most-purchased AEW PPV, and according to veteran wrestling journalist Dave Meltzer was the most-bought non-WWE professional wrestling PPV in history.

It is the oldest annual freshwater distance race in the world. 2015 marks the 107th running of the "Mac".

Chicago is home to two all-female roller derby leagues; Chicago Outfit Roller Derby and Windy City Rollers of the Women's Flat Track Derby Association. As of November 2013, Windy City is ranked 8th worldwide out of over 175 WFTDA members, hosted the WFTDA Championship in 2010, and play their home games at UIC Pavilion.
The Chicago area is also home to the Chicago Red Hots, an amateur roller derby club affiliated with USA Roller Sports under the US Olympic Committee, who play at the Cicero Stadium. The Red Hots participated in the 2013 National Championship where they placed 4th in the nation.

The city is also home to the Chicago Patriots Gaelic Football Club.

College sports
Seven NCAA Division I athletic programs reside in the Chicago metropolitan area. The DePaul Blue Demons, Loyola Ramblers, Chicago State Cougars, and UIC Flames, none of which sponsor football, are all within the city limits. All play their main revenue sport of men's basketball in the city; only DePaul does not play on its campus, instead using Wintrust Arena at the McCormick Place convention center on the Near South Side.

The Northwestern Wildcats, Northern Illinois Huskies, and Valparaiso Beacons are all programs that play in the surrounding area. Northern Illinois is a Division I Bowl Subdivision school along with Northwestern, which is the only Power Five school in the Chicago area. Although the Illinois Fighting Illini are located two hours south in Champaign, they have the largest fan following in Chicago.  The football program of Notre Dame, which is located in South Bend, Indiana, which is an hour and a half to the east, also has a huge following in the Chicago Area, especially in its southwest suburbs.

The Big Ten Conference is headquartered in Rosemont after relocating from another suburb, Park Ridge, in 2013.

Olympic bids
After a months' long process that saw the elimination of several American and international cities, Chicago was selected on April 14, 2007, to represent the United States internationally in the bidding for the 2016 Summer Olympics. The International Olympic Committee eventually shortlisted four of the seven applicant cities, where Chicago remained, before Rio de Janeiro was elected as the host in 2009. Following Chicago's loss in the race for the 2016 Olympics, the USOC bid for the 2024 Olympics with Los Angeles which result in a deal where Los Angeles secured the right to host the 2028 Summer Olympics. Chicago had previously hosted the 1959 Pan American Games. Chicago was selected to host the 1904 Summer Olympics, but they were transferred to St. Louis to coincide with the Louisiana Purchase Exposition.

Motorsports

The area is home to the Chicagoland Speedway, which is based in Joliet. As of 2019, the track hosted one race per NASCAR National Series, the (Camping World 400, Camping World 300, Camping World 225), and the Dawn 150 for the ARCA Menards Series The track formerly held the Peak Antifreeze Indy 300. However, in 2020, NASCAR announced Chicagoland will not be on the 2021 season calendar, thanks in part to the track laying off workers during the COVID-19 pandemic. It was leaked during May that the track may be transformed into an industrial park, but nothing is official.

The Route 66 Raceway is also located in Joliet.  The track hosts drag racing events.

Former teams

Baseball
Chicago Columbia Giants (Negro National League) 
Chicago Unions (Negro National League)
Chicago Union Giants (Negro National League)
Leland Giants (Negro National League)
Chicago Giants (Independent, National Negro League)
Chicago American Giants (Negro National League)
Chicago Brown Bombers (Negro Major League, United States League)
Chicago Whales (Federal League)
Chicago Colleens (All-American Girls Professional Baseball League)

Basketball
Chicago Bruins (American Basketball League)
Chicago American Gears (National Basketball League)
Chicago Stags (National Basketball Association)
Chicago Packers (currently the Washington Wizards) (NBA)
Chicago Majors (American Basketball League)
Chicago Express (World Basketball League)
Chicago Rockstars (American Basketball Association)
Chicago Skyliners (American Basketball Association)
Chicago Soldiers (American Basketball Association)
Chicago Twisters (Women's American Basketball Association)
Chicago Hustle (Women's Professional Basketball League)
Chicago Muscle (Premier Basketball League)

Football
Chicago Cardinals (National Football League)
Chicago Tigers (National Football League)
Chicago Bulls (American Football League)
Chicago Fire (World Football League)
Chicago Winds (World Football League)
Chicago Blitz (United States Football League)
Chicago Enforcers (XFL)
Chicago Bruisers (Arena Football League)
Chicago Slaughter (Indoor Football League)
Chicago Rush (Arena Football League)
Chicago Knights (Continental Indoor Football League)
Chicago Bliss (Legends Football League)

Hockey
Chicago Cougars (World Hockey Association)
Chicago Hounds (United Hockey League)
Chicago Express (ECHL)
Chi-Town Shooters (All American Hockey League)
Chicago Blaze (All American Hockey League)
Chicago Shamrocks (American Hockey Association)

Lacrosse
Chicago Shamrox (National Lacrosse League)
Chicago Machine (Major League Lacrosse)

Soccer
Chicago Spurs (National Professional Soccer League)
Chicago Mustangs (United Soccer Association)
Chicago Horizons (Major Indoor Soccer League)
Chicago Sting (North American Soccer League  and MISL)
Chicago Vultures (American Indoor Soccer Association)
Chicago Shoccers (American Indoor Soccer Association)
Chicago Power (AISA and NPSL)
Chicago Storm (Major Indoor Soccer League)
Chicago Riot (Major Indoor Soccer League)

Tennis
Chicago Aces (World Team Tennis)
Laver Cup

Softball
Chicago Bandits (National Pro Fastpitch (NPF))
Chicago Storm (American Professional Slo-Pitch League (APSPL))
Chicago Nationwide Advertising  (North American Softball League (NASL))

See also

16-inch softball
Arlington Park
Chicagoland Speedway
Chicagoland Sports Hall of Fame
Chicago bid for the 2016 Summer Olympics
Chicago Marathon
Hawthorne Race Course
Multiple major sports championship seasons

References